Christian Grimm (born February 4, 1987) is a German footballer who plays for VfR Mannheim.

Career

VfR Mannheim
Ahead of the 2019/20 season, Grimm joined VfR Mannheim.

References

External links

1987 births
Living people
German footballers
1. FSV Mainz 05 II players
SV Elversberg players
FC 08 Homburg players
VfR Mannheim players
3. Liga players
Regionalliga players
Association football midfielders
FK Pirmasens players
People from Frankenthal
Footballers from Rhineland-Palatinate